Yijun Liao, also known as Pixy Liao, is a Chinese artist, living in New York City.

Biography 
Liao was born in Shanghai. She currently lives in Brooklyn. Liao received an MFA in photography from the University of Memphis.

She is mostly known for her series Experimental Relationship. The series depicts her with her younger Japanese partner, Moro. The elaborate photography depicted challenges gender norms in regards to media and sexual expression. Her photography attempts to change the way society sees nudity and media through the lens of a whole new perspective.

Liao is a recipient of a New York Foundation for the Arts Fellowship, Santo Foundation Individual Artist Awards, Jimei x Arles International Photo Festival Madame Figaro Women Photographers Award, En Foco's New Works Fellowship and LensCulture Exposure Awards. She has been an artist in residence for University of Arts London, School of Visual Arts RISO Lab, Pioneer Works, Light Work, Lower Manhattan Cultural Council, Center for Photography at Woodstock and Camera Club of New York.

Exhibitions

Solo exhibitions 
 2008 Experimental Relationship, Adam Shaw Studio, Memphis, TN
 2011 Memphis, Tennessee, Chinese American Art Council, New York City
 2013 The Second Story of Two Stories, Kips Gallery, Seoul, Korea
 2013 Let's Make Love, the Camera Club of New York, New York City
 2015 Experimental Relationship, Circuitous Succession Gallery, Memphis, TN
 2016 Some Words are just between Us, curated by Sophia Cai, First Draft Gallery, Sydney, Austra
 2016 Venus As A Boy, LEO XU Projects, Shanghai, China
 2017 Lady and Gentleman, Galleri Vasli Souza, Malmö, Sweden
 2018 Pixy Liao, curated by Roussell, Jimei x Arles International Photo Festival, Xiamen, China
 2019 Une Relation Expérimentale the Rencontres d'Arles, Arles, France
 2019 Experimental Relationship Fotografia Europea, Reggio Emilia, Italy
 2019 Open Kimono Chambers Fine Art, New York City
 2019 Carry the Weight of You Galleri Vasli Souza, Oslo, Norway
 2020 Two Heads Stieglitz 19, Antwerp, Belgium
 2020 Experimental Relationship (for your eyes only, or maybe mine, too) curated by Henry Lu Centre A, Vancouver, Canada
2021 Your Gaze Belongs To Me curated by Holly Roussell, Fotografiska, New York

Group exhibitions 
 2015 Evidence, Format International Photography Festival, Derby, UK
 2015 No Holds Barred—Young Contemporary Art from China, curated by Boyi Feng and Lars Jonnson, OPEN ART Biennial, Örebro, Sweden
 2016 The Real Thing, Flowers Gallery, New York City
 2016 WECHAT - A Dialogue in Contemporary Chinese Art, curated by Barbara Pollack, Asia Society Texas Center, Houston, TX
 2016 Bagsim, chi K11 Art Museum in Shanghai, Shanghai, China
2016 "When We Become Us", Capsule Shanghai
 2017 NSFW: Female Gaze, Museum of Sex, New York
 2019 Holly Mosses, curated by Nick Yu, Blindspot Gallery, Hong Kong
 2020 The Body Electric, curated by Dr Shaune Lakin, National Gallery of Australia, Sydney
 2020 HOME SWEET HOME, curated by Julia Reichelt, Kunstforum der TU Darmstadt
 2022  I have not loved (enough or worked), curated by Rachel Cieśla, Art Gallery of Western Australia, Perth, Australia

Publications
Experimental Relationship Vol.1 2007–2017. Jiazazhi, 2018. . Edition of 500 copies.

References

External links
 
 Huffington Post: Couple's Gender-Bending Photo Series Challenges Our View Of Traditional Relationships
 Dazed: What happens when men and women switch roles?
 Vice: 'MATTE' Magazine Presents Pixy (Yijun Liao)
 British Journal of Photography: Pixy Liao's Experimental Relationship charts a decade of love
 Pixy Yijun Liao on Artsy
 CNN: 'I was much more dominant': Pixy Liao's surreal photography disrupts relationship stereotypes

Living people
Contemporary
Chinese contemporary artists
Artists
+Women
Photographers
Chinese photographers
Chinese women photographers
American women photographers
Artists from Shanghai
University of Memphis alumni
Year of birth missing (living people)
21st-century American women